Local TV Bristol (typeset as LOCAL TV Bristol) is a local television station serving Bristol and surrounding areas.

The station is owned and operated by Local Television Limited and forms part of a group of eight local TV stations.

Overview
In September 2012, the broadcast regulator Ofcom announced Made Television had been awarded a licence to broadcast the local TV service for the Bristol area, serving a potential audience of around 330,000 viewers. The company was unopposed in bidding for the licence.

The station began broadcasting on Freeview, Sky and Virgin Media platforms at 8pm on Wednesday 8 October 2014 - the first of Made TV's stations to be launched. After three months on air, Made in Bristol claimed a weekly audience of around 168,000 viewers. The advertising section of the Made in Bristol TV website shows the channel now receives an average of 91 viewers per week.

Since August 2015, the station has also been streaming live online via its website. On 5 April 2016, Made in Bristol moved from Freeview channel 8 to Freeview channel 7.

In February 2017, a revamp of the station's local output led to the launch of a flagship two-hour live magazine show on weeknights, The Crunch Bristol, incorporating news, sport, current affairs and entertainment.

On Thursday 25 May 2017, Made in Bristol and its sister channels began carrying acquired programming from the UK & Ireland version of factual entertainment channel TruTV as part of a supply agreement with Sony Pictures Television. The station simulcasts TruTV in two daily blocks from 1-5pm and from 9pm-1am (8pm - midnight on Tuesdays to accommodate America's Got Talent). As of November 2017, the Made network began simulcasting CBS Reality for eleven hours a day.

In November 2017, following a restructuring of the Made network's operations, The Crunch Bristol was axed, local output was cut and studio production of daily news and magazine programmes was transferred to other Made TV stations.

On 2 January 2018, Made in Bristol ceased broadcasting on digital satellite and was replaced by a generic Made Television networked feed featuring a daily three-hour block of local news programming for six of the network's licence areas, including Bristol.

In January 2022, OFCOM approved a request by the channel to close its Bristol offices and move permanently to a remote production model implemented during the COVID-19 pandemic, with content sent electronically to Local TV's broadcast centre in Leeds for playout.

Programming
Bristol TV is required to broadcast 37 hours a week of first-run programming.

As of February 2018, the station's sole local programme is Bristol Live, a rolling four-hour block of pre-recorded local news, sport and features airing each weeknight from 5-9pm. A half-hour block also airs on the generic Made Television networked feed on digital satellite each weekday evening at 5.30pm.

Programmes produced by the other Made TV stations also air on the channel along with acquired programming from independent producers and other broadcasters around the UK, including the thrice-daily programming blocks from CBS Reality - airing from 9-11am, 1-5pm and 9pm-2am.

References

External links
Official website

Local television channels in the United Kingdom
Television channels and stations established in 2014
Mass media in Bristol
Organisations based in Bristol